Daniel James Sonner (born 9 January 1972) is an English-born former Northern Ireland international footballer. He won thirteen caps in a seven-year international career.

A much-travelled midfielder, despite 18 years of professional football he never spent more than two seasons at any one club. He played for numerous English clubs, predominantly in the Midlands, and also played in Germany. In the latter part of his career he was easily recognizable due to his iconic long hair. His more notable spells were with Ipswich Town, Sheffield Wednesday, Birmingham City, and Port Vale; he played around fifty games for each club. In all he played 386 games in the English Football League, as well as more than 42 games in German football. He played in all of the top four divisions of English football, with his greatest honour being a runners-up medal in the League Cup in 2001.

Club career

Burnley
Starting his professional career with Third Division Wigan Athletic in 1990, Sonner never made a first team appearance for Bryan Hamilton's side, and so signed with Frank Casper's Fourth Division Burnley in March 1991. After Casper was replaced by Jimmy Mullen, Sonner barely featured at Turf Moor during their table-topping 1991–92 season and so was loaned out to Mike Walsh's Bury, back in the fourth tier, in November 1992, staying for the rest of the season.

Germany
Making little impact in the English Football League, he packed his bags and moved to Germany for the start of the 1993–94 season, signing with NOFV-Oberliga Süd side FC Erzgebirge Aue. After Aue's promotion he played in the third-tier Regionalliga Nordost for the 1994–95 season. He spent the 1995–96 season with Preußen Köln in the Oberliga Nordrhein.

Ipswich Town to Sheffield Wednesday
It was whilst at Cologne that he was plucked from obscurity by Ipswich Town manager George Burley. Sonner would spend the 1996–97 season in the English First Division.

In two seasons with the club he played 56 league games, half of which were substitute appearances. However, he and Burley soon fell out and Sonner was on the move to Danny Wilson's Sheffield Wednesday in October 1998 for an undisclosed fee, believed to be around £75,000. Once again Sonner had fallen on his feet, spending the 1998–99 season in the Premier League. He played the club's 8–0 thumping at the hands of Newcastle United at St James' Park on 19 September, and Wednesday suffered relegation at the end of the 1999–2000 season. He was not retained for the following season after failing to agree a new contract and was forced to search for a new club.

Birmingham City
He soon signed for Birmingham City, where he helped the club to the 2001 League Cup Final. In the quarter finals he had given his old club some food for thought, scoring in a 2–0 victory over the "Owls" on 12 December 2000. In the final he was replaced by Bryan Hughes after 71 minutes and was forced to watch his team lose the penalty shootout to Liverpool 5–4, after a 1–1 draw in normal time. In a play-off semi-final defeat at Preston North End's Deepdale, Sonner, teammate Michael Johnson and boss Trevor Francis were all charged with misconduct by the Football Association, Sonner and Johnson were also charged for using abusive language. Sonner was fined £1,000 following a hearing.

He was released by Birmingham at the end of the 2001–02 season. He played his last game for the club on 7 November 2001 and was sent off 77 minutes into a 1–0 home defeat by West Bromwich Albion after a poor challenge on Phil Gilchrist. Not long after this Steve Bruce was appointed as the club's new manager. Bruce never selected Sonner for a matchday squad, and he therefore played no part in the 2002 play-off final.

Walsall
After training with Wolverhampton Wanderers, he spent the 2002–03 season with Walsall. He got off to a bad start, wrestling opposition player Tommy Smith to the ground in a 2–0 defeat at Watford, earning a red card and causing manager Colin Lee to brand his behaviour "a disgrace". He managed to recover his reputation, scoring four goals in 28 games. After getting released at the end of the season by the cash-strapped club, he considered a move to Carlisle United, before opting for Nottingham Forest.

Nottingham Forest
He was with Forest throughout the 2003–04 season, playing 32 games over all competitions. At Forest, a bad miss caused the late Brian Clough to say: "I wish I'd been out there. I scored 250 goals in 271 games and I could have put that in with my you-know-what!" Sonner was keen to stay at the City Ground, but was released by manager Joe Kinnear at the end of the season. Sonner received an offer from Eintracht Frankfurt, a trial at Kidderminster Harriers and an offer from Portadown.

Peterborough United to Port Vale
Sonner spent the 2004–05 season at League One Peterborough United, then managed by Barry Fry. He spent February to May of that season on loan with Port Vale, making 13 appearances. Impressing during his loan spell, he signed with Vale permanently for the start of the 2005–06 season. A regular under Martin Foyle, he also spent the 2006–07 season at Vale Park, where he and Tony Dinning became the old heads at the centre of the park. Sonner was popular with the fans and in fact played more games for the club than he did for any other club. However, at the age of 35, Sonner rejected Vale's contract offer, claiming that offer was too low paying. He said: "I deserve a rise and a decent offer. The club wants me to play for next to nothing. If they carry on paying Conference wages, then the club is going nowhere. They talk about promotion, but don't want to keep players." Chairman Bill Bratt responded by saying that: "The manager had faith in Danny to pluck him from Peterborough reserves and to offer him another contract with better terms... if he thinks he is on next to nothing he should try working in the pottery industry for 40 hours a week for £200."

Later career
He moved on to former club Walsall, now led by Richard Money, but due to injury he played just seven games of the 2007–08 season before leaving the club in September 2007. In January 2008, Sonner and fellow "Saddlers" teammate, Paul Hall both joined League Two strugglers Wrexham. He was released by manager Brian Little in May 2008, following the club's relegation to the Conference. Sonner scored once during his spell at Wrexham, his goal coming in a 2–2 draw with Morecambe on 29 January 2008.

International career
Sonner has represented Northern Ireland 13 times. Between 1995 and 1999 he also earned four Northern Ireland B caps, scoring one goal.

He earned his first cap on 10 September 1997 in a 1–0 defeat to Albania in Zürich. His second cap came in a 3–0 home loss to Germany on 27 March 1999 in a Euro 2000 qualifier. The rest of his caps were all friendlies. His first start for Northern Ireland came in Belfast on 26 April 2000, his sixth cap – the Northern Irish beat the Hungarians 1–0.

After three years away from the international scene, he was recalled in February 2004. He played six games in 2004 after being recalled, his last one coming in a goalless draw with Switzerland on 18 August.

Style of play
Sonner was a midfielder with long hair, a languid playing style and excellent vision and passing skills.

Coaching career
Sonner joined Savannah United (based in Savannah, Georgia) as a staff coach in August 2015.

Career statistics

Club level

International level

Honours
Burnley
Football League Fourth Division: 1991–92

Birmingham City
League Cup runner-up: 2001

References

Footballers from Wigan
English footballers
Association footballers from Northern Ireland
Northern Ireland B international footballers
Northern Ireland international footballers
Association football midfielders
Wigan Athletic F.C. players
Burnley F.C. players
Bury F.C. players
Expatriate association footballers from Northern Ireland
Expatriate footballers in Germany
FC Viktoria Köln players
FC Erzgebirge Aue players
Ipswich Town F.C. players
Sheffield Wednesday F.C. players
Birmingham City F.C. players
Walsall F.C. players
Nottingham Forest F.C. players
Peterborough United F.C. players
Port Vale F.C. players
Wrexham A.F.C. players
Premier League players
English Football League players
English expatriates in the United States
Association football coaches
1972 births
Living people